Candomblé is an African diasporic religion that developed in Brazil during the 19th century. It arose through a process of syncretism between several of the traditional religions of West Africa, especially those of the Yoruba, Bantu, and Gbe. There is some influence of Roman Catholic form of Christianity. There is no central authority in control of Candomblé, which is organized around autonomous terreiros (houses).

Candomblé involves the veneration of spirits known as orixás. Deriving their names and attributes from traditional West African deities, they are equated with Roman Catholic saints. Various myths are told about these orixás, which are regarded as subservient to a transcendent creator deity, Oludumaré. Each individual is believed to have a tutelary orixá who has been connected to them since before birth and who informs their personality. An initiatory tradition, Candomblé's members usually meet in temples known as terreiros run by priests called babalorixás and priestesses called ialorixás. A central ritual involves practitioners drumming, singing, and dancing to encourage an orixá to possess one of their members. They believe that through this possessed individual, they can communicate directly with a deity. Offerings to the orixás include fruit and sacrificed animals. Offerings are also given to a range of other spirits, including boiadero, preto velho, caboclos, and the spirits of the dead, the egun. Several forms of divination are utilized to decipher messages from the orixás. Healing rituals and the preparation of amulets and herbal remedies and baths, also play a prominent role.

Candomblé developed among Afro-Brazilian communities amid the Atlantic slave trade of the 16th to 19th centuries. It arose through the blending of the traditional religions brought to Brazil by enslaved West and Central Africans, the majority of them Yoruba, Fon, and Bantu, and the Roman Catholic teachings of the Portuguese colonialists who then controlled the area. It primarily coalesced in the Bahia region during the 19th century. In places, it merged with another Afro-Brazilian religion, Umbanda. Following Brazil's independence from Portugal, the constitution of 1891 enshrined freedom of religion in the country, although Candomblé remained marginalized by the Roman Catholic establishment, which typically associated it with criminality. In the 20th century, growing emigration from Bahia spread Candomblé both throughout Brazil and abroad. The late 20th century saw growing links between Candomblé and related traditions in West Africa and the Americas, such as Cuban Santería and Haitian Vodou. Since the late 20th century, some practitioners have emphasized a re-Africanization process to remove Roman Catholic influences and create forms of Candomblé closer to traditional West African religion.

Each terreiro is autonomous although can be divided into distinct denominations, known as nations, based on which traditional West African belief system has been its primary influence. The most prominent nations are the Ketu, Jeje, and Angola. There are nearly 170,000 practitioners in Brazil, although smaller communities exist elsewhere, especially other parts of South America. Both in Brazil and abroad Candomblé has spread beyond its Afro-Brazilian origins and is practiced by individuals of various ethnicities.

Definition and terminology 

Candomblé is a religion. More specifically, it has been described as an "African American religion", an Afro-Brazilian religion, a "neo-African" religion, "an African diasporic spirit possession religion", and "one of the major religious expressions of the African Diaspora". The anthropologist Paul Christopher Johnson stated that, "at its most basic level", Candomblé can be defined as "the practice of exchange with orixás"; the scholar Joana Bahia called it "the religion of the orishas." Johnson also defined it as "a Brazilian redaction of West African religions recreated in the radically new context of a nineteenth-century Catholic slave colony." The term Candomblé  probably derived from a kandombele, a Bantu-derived term for dances, which also developed into the term Candombe, used to describe a dance style among African-descended communities in Argentina and Uruguay.

Various religions in the Americas arose through the blending of West African traditions with Roman Catholicism; due to their shared origins, Cuban Santería and Haitian Vodou have been described as "sister religions" of Candomblé. In Brazil, it was Yoruba traditional religion which eventually became dominant over Afro-Brazilian religion. Candomblé is not the only Afro-Brazilian religion, being closely related to another that also arose in the 19th century and involves the worship of the orixás, Umbanda. Umbanda is usually more open and public than Candomblé; while the latter employs songs in African languages, Umbanda's religious songs are sung in Portuguese. As a result, Candomblé is often regarded as being more African than Umbanda. The term "Umbandomblé" is sometimes applied to groups merging elements of both traditions, although this is rarely embraced by practitioners themselves. Another Afro-Brazilian religion is Quimbanda, and is associated primarily with Rio de Janeiro, while the term Macumba has been used primarily to describe Afro-Brazilian traditions dealing with lower spirits, the exus. Candomblé has also been influenced by Spiritism, although many Spiritists are keen to distinguish their tradition from Afro-Brazilian religions. Scholars often regard these different Afro-Brazilian traditions as existing on a continuum rather than being firmly distinct from each other.

Candomblé divides into different traditions known as nacões (nations). The three most prominent are Ketu (Queto) or Nagô, Jeje (Gege) or Mina-Jeje, and Angola or Congo-Angola; others include the Ijexá and Caboclo. Each derives particular influence from a particular African language group; Ketu uses Yoruba, Jeje uses Ewe, and the Angola draws from the Bantu language group. Each nation has its own lexicon, chants, deities, sacred objects, and traditional knowledge, informed by its ethno-linguistic origins. Although originating among ethnic differences, this has largely eroded over time, with members drawn to different nations for reasons other than ethnic heritage.
As of 2012, the Nagô nation has been described as the largest. The Angola nation is sometimes characterised as being the most syncretic.

Candomblé is not institutionalised, with there being no central authority in the religion to determine doctrine and orthodoxy. It is heterogenous, and has no central sacred text or dogma.
There is regional variation in the beliefs and practices of Candomblé. Each lineage or community of practitioners is autonomous, approaching the religion in ways informed by their tradition and the choices of their leader. Some practitioners also refer to it as a form of science.

Practitioners

Candomblé's followers are sometimes called povo de santo (people of saint), or candomblecistas. An individual who has taken steps toward initiation but not yet undergone this process is termed an abiã.
A newer initiate is known as an iaô, and an elder initiate is known as an ebomi. 
In Candomblé, a male priest is known as a babalorixá, a female priestess as iyalorixá, or alternatively as a makota or nêngua. The choice of term used can indicate which nation a person belongs to.

Most adherents of Candomblé also practice Roman Catholicism, and some priests and priestesses will not initiate anyone into Candomblé who is not a baptised Roman Catholic. Some attend both Candomblé rituals and Evangelical Protestant services. Syncretism can be observed in other ways. The anthropologist Jim Wafer observed a Brazilian practitioner who included a statue of the Mahayana Buddhist deity Hotei on their altar, while Arnaud Halloy encountered a Belgian terreiro whose head was incorporating characters from Welsh and Slavic mythologies in their practice, and the scholar Joana Bahia found practitioners in Germany who also practiced Buddhism and various New Age practices.

Beliefs

Knowledge about Candomblé's beliefs and practices is referred to as the fundamentos (foundations"), and is guarded by practitioners. 
Yoruba terminology predominates widely, even across terreiros of other nations.

Olorun and the orixás

In Candomblé, the supreme deity is called Olorun or Olodumare. This entity is regarded as the creator of everything but as being distant and unapproachable. Olorun is thus not specifically worshipped in Candomblé.

The Orixás

Candomblé focuses on the worship of spirits termed orixás (or orishas) or santos ("saints"). The males are termed aborôs, the females iabás. These have been varyingly conceived as ancestral figures, or embodiments of forces of nature. Around 12 orixás are well-developed figures in the Candomblé pantheon and recognized by most practitioners. Although usually given Yoruba names, in the Jeje nation they are instead given Fon names.

The orixás are believed to mediate between humanity and Olorun. The orixás are understood as being morally ambiguous, each with their own virtues and flaws; they are sometimes in conflict with other orixás.
In Candomblé, the relationship between the orixás and humanity is seen as being one of interdependence, with practitioners seeking to build harmonious relationships with these deities, thus securing their protection. Each orixá is associated with specific colours, foods, animals, and minerals, favoring certain offerings. Each orixá is associated with a particular day of the week; the priesthood also states that each year is governed by a specific orixá who will influence the events taking place within it. Their personalities are informed by a key conceptual opposition in Candomblé, that of the cool versus the hot.

Oxalá is the chief orixá, depicted as a frail old man who walks with a pachorô sceptre as a walking stick. Practitioners commonly believe that Olorun tasked him with creating humanity. In some accounts, all of the junior orixás are the children of Oxalá and one of his two wives, Nanã and Iemanjá. This trio are associated with water; Oxalá with fresh water, Nanã with the rain, and Iemanjá with the ocean. Other accounts present this cosmogony differently, for instance by claiming that Oxalá fathered all other orixás alone, having created the world from a mingau pudding. An alternative claim among practitioners is that Nanã is the grandmother of Oxalá and the mother of Iemanjá, the latter becoming both mother and wife to Oxalá.

Xangô is the orixá associated with thunder and lightning; one of his wives is Obá, a warrior who has only one ear. Ogum is the orixá of battle and of iron, often depicted with a machete; her companion is Oxóssi, the male orixá of the hunt and forest. Obaluaiê or Omolu is the orixá associated with infectious disease and its cure, while Osanyin is associated with leaves, herbs, and herbal knowledge. Oya is the orixá of wind and storms. Oxumaré is regarded as both male and female and is portrayed as a serpent or a rainbow. Oxum is the orixá of love, beauty, wealth and luxury, and is associated with fresh water, fish, mermaids, and butterflies. She is married to Ifa, regarded as the orixá of divination. Tempo is the orixá of time; originating in the Angola nation, he is associated with trees. Due to the link with trees, he is sometimes equated with the Ketu-Nagô orixá Loko. The orixá Exú is regarded as a capricious trickster; as the guardian of entrances, he facilitates contact between humanity and the other orixá, thus usually being honoured and fed first in any ritual. His ritual paraphernalia is often kept separate from that of other orixás, while the entrances to most terreiros will have a clay head, decorated with cowries or nails, that represents Exu and is given offerings.

Each orixá equates with a Roman Catholic saint. This may have begun as a subterfuge to retain the worship of African deities under European rule, although such syncretisms could have already been occurring in Africa prior to the Atlantic slave trade. From the later 20th century, some practitioners have attempted to distance the orixás from the saints as a means of re-emphasising the religion's West African origins. Robert A. Voeks observed that it was the priesthood and more formally educated practitioners who preferred to distinguish the orixás from the saints, whereas less formally educated adherents tended not to. 
In Candomblé altars, the orixás are often represented with images and statues of Roman Catholic saints. For instance, Oxalá has been conflated with Our Lord of Bonfim, Oxum with Our Lady of the Immaculate Conception, and Ogum with St Anthony of Padua. Due to his association with time, Tempo is sometimes equated with the Christian idea of the Holy Spirit.

The orixás are regarded as having different aspects, known as marcas ("types" or "qualities"), each of which may have an individual name. Child forms of the orixás are termed erês. They are deemed the most uncontrollable spirits of all, associated with obscenities and pranks. The child forms of orixás have specific names; the erê of Oxalá is for instance called Ebozingo ("Little Ebô") and Pombinho ("Little Dove"). 
The material image of an orixá is called an igbá.

Relationships with the orixá

Candomblé teaches that everyone is linked to a particular orixá, the identity of whom can be ascertained through divination. This orixá is described as being dono da cabeça: the "master or mistress of the person's head," or the "owner of the head." It is believed that they have an influence on the person's personality and social interactions. The gender of this tutelary orixá is not necessarily the same as their human's; non-heterosexuality is sometimes viewed, in a non-negative light, as being caused by a mismatch between the gender of an individual and the gender of their orixá. Failing to identify one's orixá is sometimes interpreted as the cause of various types of mental illness by practitioners. Depending on the orixá in question, an initiate may choose to avoid or to engage in certain activities, such as not eating specific foods or wearing specific colours. Some practitioners also believe that there are other orixá who could be linked to an individual; a second is known as the juntó, while a third is called the adjuntó, the tojuntó, or the dijuntó. Some believe that an individual can also have a fourth orixá, inherited from a deceased relative.

Exus, caboclos, and erês

Candomblé teaches the existence of spirits other than the orixás. One of these spirit groups are the exus, sometimes termed exuas when female, or exu-mirims when children. They are deemed closer to humanity than the orixás and thus more accessible. In ritual contexts, the exus are often regarded as the "slaves" of the orixás. In common parlance they are often described as "devils", but in Candomblé are not regarded as a force for absolute evil but rather thought capable of both good and bad acts. Practitioners believe that the exus can "open" or "close" the "roads" of fate in one's life, bringing about both help and harm. Candomblé teaches that the exus can be induced to do a practitioner's bidding, although need to be carefully controlled.

Also present in Candomblé are the caboclos, the name of which probably derives from the Tupi language term kari'boka ("deriving from the white"). These spirits come in two main forms: boiadeiros ("cowboys" or "backwoodsmen") and indigenous peoples of the Americas. In rarer cases, caboclos are linked to other contexts, portrayed as being from the sea or from foreign countries such as Italy or Japan. Almost exclusively portrayed as male, the caboclos are believed to dwell in a forest land called Aruanda, which is also inhabited by flying snake-like reptiles called cainanas. The caboclos favor beer, whereas the exus prefer wine and hard liquor, especially cachaça; the caboclos are also characterised as smoking cigars. Those practitioners who have tried to "re-Africanize" Candomblé since the late 20th century have tended to reject the caboclos as being of non-African derivation.

Birth and the dead

Candomblé espouses a cosmology largely borrowed from Yoruba traditional religion. The realm of the spirits is termed orun; the material world of humanity is called aiê (or aiye). Orun is believed to divide into nine levels. Death is personified in the figure of Iku. A person's inner head, in which their tutelary orixá is believed to reside, is called the ori.

The spirits of the dead are called egums or eguns. Those who are only recently deceased are termed aparacá, while after they have been "educated" by receiving sacrifices they become babá. Precautions need to be taken regarding these entities, for they have the power to harm the living. Sometimes they will seek to help a living individual but inadvertently harm them. The contra-egum is an armband made of plaited raffia which is sometimes worn to ward off these dead spirits. Typically discouraged in Candomblé, possession by egums is considered rare, but does happen. Many Canbomblé groups have prohibitions on allowing possession by the dead, deeming it spiritually polluting, a viewpoint that distinguishes Candomblé from Umbanda.
After death, the egun can enter orun, although the level they reach depends on the spiritual growth they attained in life.

Axé
Candomblé teaches the existence of a force called ashe or axé, a central concept in Yoruba-derived traditions. Walker described axé as "the spiritual force of the universe", Bahia called it "sacred force," Wafer termed it "vital force", while Voeks favored "vital energy". Johnson characterised it as "a creative spiritual force with real material effects."

Practitioners believe axé can move around, but can also be  concentrated in specific objects, such as leaves and roots, or in specific body parts, especially blood, which is deemed to contain axé in its most concentrated form. Humans can accumulate axé, but also either lose it or transfer it. Specific rituals and obligations are believed to maintain and enhance a person's axé, while other ritual acts are designed to attract or share this force.

Morality, ethics, and gender roles

Candomblé generally has no fixed ethical precepts that it expects practitioners to follow, although its teachings influence the lives of its adherents. Rather than stressing a dichotomy between good and evil, emphasis is placed on achieving equilibrium between competing forces. Problems that arise in a person's life are often interpreted as resulting from a disharmony in an individual's relationship with their orixá; harmony is ensured by following the orixá's euó (taboos) regarding issues like food, drink, and colors. Relationships are rooted in reciprocal obligations.

Male/female polarity is a recurring theme throughout Candomblé. Many roles within Candomblé are linked to members of a specific gender. For instance, both animal sacrifice and the shaving of an initiate's head are usually reserved for male practitioners, while female practitioners are typically responsible for domestic duties in maintaining the ritual space. Such divisions mirror broader gender norms in Brazilian society. Taboos are also placed on women while menstruating. However, women can still wield significant power as the heads of the terreiros, with most terreiros in Bahia being led by women; some have called it a female-dominated religion. The prominent place of priestesses within Candomblé has led observers like the anthropologist Ruth Landes to describe it as a matriarchal religion, although such a characterisation has been disputed.

There is evidence that Candomblé is more accepting of sexual and gender non-conformity than mainstream Brazilian society. Although many male priests in the religion have been heterosexual, there is a pervasive stereotype that Candomblé's male practitioners are homosexual. Gay men have described the religion as a more welcoming environment than forms of Christianity practiced in Brazil. They for instance have cited stories of relationships between male orixás, such as Oxôssi and Ossain, as affirming male same-sex attraction. Some practitioners have involved themselves in political causes including environmentalism, indigenous rights, and the Black Power movement.

Practices

Johnson noted that Candomblé was a "ritual-centric" religion, whose practitioners often regard it as a religion "of right practice instead of right doctrine", in that performing its rituals correctly is deemed more important that believing in the orixás. Johnson noted that Candomblé devoted "little attention" to "abstract theologizing". Rituals are often focused on pragmatic needs regarding issues such as prosperity, health, love, and fecundity; they often begin long after the advertised starting time.
Those engaging in Candomblé include various initiates of varying degrees and non-initiates who may attend events and approach initiates seeking help with various problems. Johnson characterised Candomblé as a secret society, as it makes use of secrecy. It is organized hierarchically.

Houses of Worship

Candomblé is practiced in buildings called terreiros ("houses"), ilês, or ilê orixás.
Ranging in size from small houses to large compounds, some are well-known and wealthy, but most are smaller examples of what Roger Bastide called "proleterian candomblés." These may be concealed, so as not to attract the attention of opponents. Each terreiro is independent and operates autonomously, often disbanding when their chief priest or priestess dies. A terreiro's importance is generally regarded as being proportional to the number of initiates and clients that it has.

Terreiros consists of a series of rooms, some off-limits to non-initiates. They contain an altar to the deities, a space to perform ceremonies, and accommodation for the priests or priestesses. The floor is deemed sacred, consecrated to the tutelary orixá of the house. The bakisse is the "room of the saints", a storeroom containing both ritual paraphernalia and the assentamentos of the orixás, while the roncó ("retreat room") or camarinha is used during initiations.

One room, the barracão ("big shed"), is where public rituals, including acts of divination, take place; terreiros lacking a barracão may use a yard for public rituals. The peji, or shrines to deities, will often be located around the perimeter of the barracão. The terreiro will often have a cumeeira, central pole in the structure believed to link our world with the otherworld of the orixá. This stands above the entoto ("foundation") of the terreiro, a space which is periodically "fed" with offerings. The terreiro's enclosure may have a tree dedicated to Tempo, onto which strips of white cloth have been affixed, as well as a place set aside for the souls of the dead, termed the balé, which is usually at the back of the terreiro grounds. 
Most venerate between twelve and twenty orixás.

Priesthood and congregation
A priestess running a terreiro is a mâe de santo (mother of saints), a priest who does so is a pai de santo (father of saints). They are responsible for all important functions, including educating novices, adjudicating disputes, and providing healing and divination services; it is these latter services that many rely on as their primary income. Not constrained by external religious authorities, these "parents of saints" often exert considerable control over their initiates, who are expected to submit to their authority; conflicts between these "parents" and their initiates are nevertheless common. The head priest and priestess is assisted by others, including the "little mother", the iyakekerê or mãa pequena, and the "little father". Other roles in the terreiro include the iyabase, who prepares food for the orixás, and the alabê (musical director). The initiates, called the filhos (sons) and filhas de santo (daughters of the saints), assist as cooks, cleaners, and gardeners. The ogã are male members, often not initiated, whose role is largely honorific, consisting largely of contributing financially.

The terreiro's members are regarded as a "family" and its initiates consider each one another to be 'brothers' and 'sisters' in the orixá (irmãos de santo). Sexual or romantic relations between terreiro members is usually forbidden, although happen nevertheless. Being initiated connects an individual to the historical lineage of the terreiro; this lineage is linked to the axé of the terreiro, an axé that can be transferred from a mother-terreiro to a new one being established. The founders of a terreiro are called essas.

The community of a terreiro is called an egbé. There can be enmity between terreiros, for they compete with one another for members, and defection of individuals from one to another being common.
Public ceremonies take place at the terreiros where both initiates and non-initiates can attend to celebrate the orixás. At these, food is offered to specific orichas while the rest is shared among participants, with the latter thereby gaining some of the axé of the orichas. These public rites are both preceded and succeeded by a range of private ritual acts.
Most of the rituals that take place at the terreiros are private and open only to initiates. Walker believed that it was these that represented "the real core of the religious life of the Candomblé community."

African-derived terms are used in ritual contexts, although do not exceed one thousand words. In general, words of Yoruba origin predominate in the Nagô-Ketu nations, those from Ewe-Fon languages are most common in Jeje nations, and words from the Bantu languages dominate the Angola nation. 
Yoruba is used as a ritual language, although few practitioners understand the meanings of these Yoruba words. There are no specific sacred texts.
Ritual objects are regarded as loci and accumulators of axé, although this supply needs replenishing at various intervals. Each terreiro is also regarded as having its own axé, which is strengthened by the number of initiates it has and the number of rituals it carries out.

Priests and priestesses are regarded as intermediaries between the orixás and humanity. Becoming initiated implies a relationship of mutual responsibility between the new initiate and the orixás.
Some evidence suggests that the proportion of female priestesses grew over the course of the 20th century.

The orixá are "seated" within objects in the terreiro. These are then stored, either all together in one room or, if space permits, in separate rooms. Women initiates who do not enter trance but assist those who do are called ekedi; their male counterparts are termed ogan.
A prostration before the priest or priestess, or before someone possessed by an orixá, is termed a dobalé; prostrating before one's mother or father of the saint is called iká.

Shrines and otás

An altar to the orixás is called a peji. It contains an assemblage of objects termed the assentamento ("seat") or assento of the orixá, regarded as their house. This usually consists of various items placed within an enamel, earthenware, or wooden vessel, itself often wrapped in a cloth. The key part of the assentamento is a sacred stone known as an otá. This otá possesses axé, and thus requires feeding. Different orixa are associated with different kinds of stone; those from the ocean or rivers are for instance linked to Oxum and Iemanjá, while those believed to have fallen from the sky are linked to Xangô. Practitioners are expected to find them, rather than buy them. They will then be ritually consecrated, being washed, given offerings, and "seated" in a vessel.

Alongside the otás, vessels often contain ferramentos, or metal objects associated with specific orixá, cowrie shells, bracelets called idés, animal body parts, statues of the associated Roman Catholic saints, and a mix of water, honey, and herbal preparations. They may also include hair from the initiate to whom they belong. The assentamento can be stored in the home, or inside the terreiro's bakisse room, which is only opened by the priestess or priest in charge. There, the assentamentos of the initiates may be arranged on a multi-level altar, which is decorated with ribbons, colored lights, and flowers.

Ritual objects are sanctified with a herbal infusion called amaci.
Practitioners believe that in giving blood to their ritual paraphernalia it renews the axé of these objects. In Brazil, various stores specialise in paraphernalia required in Camdomblé.

Offerings and animal sacrifice

Offerings are known as ebós, and are believed to generate axé which then gives the orixá the power to aid their worshippers. Material offered to the orixás or lesser spirits in these ebós include food, drink, fowl, and money; when animal sacrifice is not involved, a food offering is termed a comida seca. When a ceremony starts, practitioners typically provide a padé, or propitiatory offering, to the orixá Exu. Food is offered to the orixá, often being placed at an appropriate location in the landscape; offerings to Oxum are for instance often placed by a freshwater stream. Specific foodstuffs are associated with each orixá; a mix of okra with rice or manioc meal, known as amalá, is considered a favourite of Xangô, Obá, and Iansã. When placed in the terreiro, food is typically left in place for between one and three days, sufficient time for the orixá to consume the essence of the food. The ritual payment of money, often accompanying the sacrifices, is termed dinheiro do chão ("money for the floor"). As part of this, money is placed onto the floor and often splattered with blood, before being divided among the participants of the rite.

Candomblé entails the sacrifice of animals to orixás, exus, caboclos, and eguns, which is called matanças. The individual who conducts the sacrifice is known as an axogun (or axogum) or sometimes as a faca (knife). Species typically used are chickens, guinea fowl, white doves, and goats. The animal will often have its neck cut with a knife, or in the case of birds, its head severed. After the animal is killed, its blood is spilled onto the altar; its organs are then often removed and placed around the "seat" of the orixá. Following the sacrifice, is it common for divination to be performed to determine if the sacrifice has been accepted by the spirits. Other body parts will then be consumed by the participants of the rite; the exception is if the sacrifice was for eguns, which is instead left to rot or placed in a river. Some of the food may then be taken away, to be left in the forest, thrown into a body of water, or placed at a crossroads; this is referred to as "suspending a sacrifice".

Bird sacrifices are sometimes performed not as an offering, but as part of a ritual cleansing; the bird will sometimes be wiped over the human requiring cleansing; it will then have its legs, wings, and finally its neck broken. In these cases, the bird is not then eaten.
Outside Brazil, practitioners have faced challenges in performing animal sacrifice; in Germany, for instance, it is banned by law.

Initiation

Practicing Candomblé requires initiation, and the religion is structured around a hierarchical system of initiations. To be initiated is referred to as feito, while the process of initiation is termed fazer cabeça ("to make the head") or fazer o santo ("making the saint").
Initiates in Candomblé are known as filhos de santo ("children of the saints"). At their initiation, they are given a new name, the nome de santo (saint's name), which usually indicates the identity of their tutelary orixá. Many individuals arrive at Candomblé through problems in their lives, such as sickness. A priest or priestess will use divination to determine the cause of the problem and its remedy, sometimes revealing that initiation into the religion will fix the issue. Many feel that an orixa has demanded their initiation, with it being their obrigação ("duty"). If a group of individuals are being initiated together, they are termed a barco ("boat").

The length of the initiatory process varies between Candomblé houses but usually lasts from a few weeks to a few months. The initiate is first brought to the terreiro, where they are left for a period of relaxation, the descanso, so that they might become 'cool', as opposed to 'hot'. They will be dressed in white clothing; a small bell may be attached to them to alert others if they leave the terreiro. One of the first acts during the initiatory process is to give the initiate a string of beads associated with their orixá. The necklace is colored according to the tutelary orixá of the initiate; white for Oxalá, dark blue for Ogum, or red and white for Xangô, for instance. These beads will be washed and sprinkled with the blood of a sacrificed animal. These beads are sometimes perceived as protecting the wearer from harm.

The initiate is then secluded in a room in the terreiro called the roncô, during which time they are termed an îao. In the roncô, they sleep on a straw mat, eating only bland food; often they will not be permitted to speak. During this period they are taught the various details of their associated orixá, such as its likes and dislikes and the appropriate drum rhythms and dances that invoke that deity. The time spent in isolation varies, although three weeks is typical. They will be bathed in water mixed with herbs, especially their head, which will then be shaved.

The initiate is then taken into a neighbouring room, where altars have been set up. A drummer plays while pre-existing initiates sing praise songs. Animals are sacrificed, including from a four-legged animal, and some of the blood may be touched on parts of the initiate's body. The initiate's head is then shaved and two cuts made into the apex of it with a razor; a mix of animal blood and herbs may be added to the incisions. This is done to allow the orixá entry into the head. A cone of wax, the adoxu, is then placed on the wound to stem the bleeding; the head will then be wrapped in cloth. Depending on the terreiro, cuts may also be made on the tip of the initiate's tongue, on their back, upper arms, thighs, buttocks, and the soles of their feet. With the incisions made, the orixá is "seated" within the individual's head during the assentar o santo ritual.

Following the initiation, the new initiate may be presented to the rest of the community through a public "coming-out" ceremony, the saida. Along with their white clothes, their body will be covered in white spots. During this, they may be expected to give the name of the marca of their tutelary orixá, which they are supposed to have discovered via a dream. In the panán, the initiate is symbolically re-taught mundane tasks, a ritual sometimes followed by an auction in which the initiate is symbolically sold to their spouse or a member of their family, a reference to the era of slavery. On the following Friday, they are expected to attend mass in a Roman Catholic church, known as the romaria. Finally, a senior member of the terreiro will lead the initiate, still wearing white, back to their home.
Over the course of the following year, the initiate may conduct further "obligations" to build their relationship with the orixá.

Candomblé includes a number of additional, graded initiations, which are expected to take place one year, three years, and then seven years after the original initiatory ceremony. Over the course of this they are expected to learn to receive all of their tutelary orixa. Those who have performed seven years of initiatory rituals are called ebomi or ebame. At the end of the seven years, they "receive the decá" from their initiator, being given a tray of ritual objects; this enables them to go and form their own temple. In practice, many adherents cannot afford to pay for these ceremonies at the specified time and they instead take place many years after.

Possession

Music and dance is a fundamental element of Candomblé. The drumming will often take place all night. Participants are expected to wear white, with women wearing skirts. Three main types of drum are employed, the largest being the rum, the middle-sized being the rumpi, and the smallest being the lé. These drums are understood as living and need to be fed. The head drummer is known as the alabê. Many terreiros maintain that women should not be involved in this ritual drumming, although others reject this tradition. In some rituals, practitioners will drink a concoction containing jurema, a mildly hallucinogenic plant, which is sometimes mixed with the blood of sacrificed animals.

The state of vertigo signalling the onset of trance is known as barravento. As the trance begins, practitioners often experience a body spasm termed the arrepio ("shiver").
Practitioners believe that when an individual is possessed by a spirit, they have no control over the latter's actions.
Within Candomblé, it is regarded as a privilege to be possessed by an orixá. A common Bahian way of referring to the possession is receber ("to receive"). As it entails being "mounted", being possessed is regarded as being a symbolically female role. For this reason, many heterosexual men refuse initiation into Candomblé; some believe that involvement in these rites can turn a man homosexual. Among practitioners, it is sometimes claimed that in the past men did not take part in the dances that lead to possession. Often, those believed possessed by an orixá will not eat, drink, or smoke, emphasising their aristocratic disposition, and that they will also rarely if ever speak. When they dance, it will often be stylized and controlled. Many terreiros prohibit photography of those undergoing a possession trance.

After an individual becomes possessed, they may be led into an anteroom to be dressed in clothes associated with the possessing orixá; this usually includes brightly colored dresses, regardless of the gender of those involved. Those possessed by Ogun will for instance often be given a metal helmet and axe, while those possessed by Oxum wear a crowd and carry a sword and the abebé fan.
Practitioners may fully prostrate themselves before the possessed.
Those possessed by an orixá may deliver predictions and prophecies.
The style of speech adopted by the possessed will be influenced by the type of spirit believed to be possessing them. Those deemed to be possessed by caboclos will often smoke cigars, and sometimes place gunpowder into the palm of their hand, which they then light with their cigar to cause an explosion.
A false trance is known as an equê. Those who do not go into a trance are known as ogâs if male, and equedes if female.

Public festivals

Although details of the liturgical calendar vary among terreiros, Candomblé features a yearly cycle of festivals or feasts to the orixás. These are sometimes private and sometimes open to the public. These are typically held on the Roman Catholic saint's day associated with the saint linked to a particular orixá. The main festival season begins in September, with the feast of Oxala, and continues through to February, when the feast of Yemanja takes place.

In some cases, Candomblé festivals have become widely popular with the public, especially those of Oxala and Yemanja. Hundreds of thousands of people congregate at the beach on Yemanja's Day (2 February), where they often load offerings to her onto boats, which then take them out into the water and cast them overboard. 
Festivals for the caboclos usually take place on 2 July, the day which marks Bahia's independence from Portugal.

Some terreiros hold public festivals for both the orixás and the caboclos, although some only hold them for one of these two categories of spirit. Public festivals for exus are rarer. The tone of the event differs depending on which spirit category is being honoured; those for the orixás have more of a fixed structure and a greater formality, while those for the caboclos are more spontaneous and have greater interaction between the spirits and the human participants.
In the Nagô-Jeje nation, the Waters of Oxala ritual is performed at the start of the liturgical year; it involves bringing fresh water, sometimes from a well, to the terreiro to purify and replenish the assamentos.

Divination

Priests and priestesses engage in divination, which often proves a key source of income for them.
The most common form of divination in Brazil is the dilogun or jogo dos buzios ("shell game"), which is performed by both men and women. It entails throwing cowrie shells onto the floor and then interpreting answers from the sides onto which they have landed. It is common for 16 shells to be thrown, and then a further four to confirm the answer provided by the first throwing. Each configuration of shells is associated with certain odu, or mythological stories. The specific odu is then interpreted as having pertinence for the client's situation.

Another common divinatory practice involves slicing an onion in two and dropping the pieces to the ground drawing conclusions from the face onto which they fall; alternatively a kola nut may be cut into quarters and read in the same way. Ifá is another divinatory system practised by the Yoruba people, specifically by male initiates called babalawos;  however, by the start of the 21st century this was characterised as being either extinct, or very rare in Brazil.

Healing
Healing rituals form an important part of Candomblé. When acting in a healing capacity, practitioners are often called curandeiros. Priests and priestesses may offer healing for a wide range of conditions, ranging from obesity and hair loss to pneumonia and cancer.

Candomblé teaches that many personal problems are caused by a disequilibrium with the spirit world. Thus, staying healthy can be ensured through ensuring a state of equilibrium with the orixás, avoiding excess, and following lessons imparted in the religion's mythological tales. A sick person is regarded as having an "open" body that is vulnerable to harmful influences and lacks axé. The religion teaches that ailments may be a punishment from the orixás, or that a spirit of the dead may attach itself to an individual or even possess them, thus causing harm. It is also believed that humans can cause harm to others via supernatural means, either inadvertently, through the mau-olhado (evil eye), or through witchcraft and cursing, which practitioners seek to counter.

Individuals will often approach a priest or priestess seeking a remedy to a problem in their life, such as sickness. The priest or priestess will use divination to ascertain the cause and remedy. The first step in the healing process is the limpeza, or spiritual cleansing. This will often entail providing an offering to a particular orixá or lesser spirit; a sacudimento (leaf whipping), whereby certain leaves are wiped over the patient's body; or an abô (leaf bath), during which they are washed in water infused with various herbs and other ingredients. Healing the patient may also necessitate their initiation into the religion. Another type of ceremony is known as the bori. This entails placing food on the individual's head to feed the orixá that is believed to partially reside within the cranium. This may be conducted to bolster the individual's health and well-being or to give them additional strength before an important undertaking. Another is the "cleansing of the body" rite, designed to remove an egum that is troubling an individual. In the troca da cobeça rite, the sickness is transferred to another, especially an animal that is then killed. The healer may also recommend that the sick person seek help from a medical professional like a doctor.

Candomblé healers are often well versed in herbalism. Herbs are deemed to contain axé which needs to be appropriately awakened, but if improperly harvested can lose potency. The leaves used should be fresh, not dried, and often picked late at night or early in the morning to ensure their maximum potency. They are often purchased from one of the casas de folhas ("houses of leaves") in markets, but if taken from the forest, permission should be sought from the overseeing orixá and offerings left, such as coins, honey, or tobacco. These may then be rubbed directly only the sick person, or brewed into a chá tea or other medicinal concoction; practitioners may also produce pó (powder), which may have a variety of uses, from healing to harming or attracting someone's romantic attention. 
Historically, terreiros could retain African medical traditions, where they would have hybridized with Native American and European traditions. An individual knowledgeable about leaves is called a mâo de ofá.

Like many other Brazilians, Candomblé will often wear amulets, sometimes concealed beneath clothing to avoid unwanted attention. Common examples are horns or the figa, a fist with the thumb in inserted between the index and middle finger. A patuá consists of a small cloth pouch containing various objects, plant parts, and texts. Sprigs of the arruda or laranja-da-terra plants may also be carried on the body to protect against the evil eye. Specific plants, associated with a particular orixá, are often kept by doorways to prevent the entry of negative forces.

Funerals and the dead

Following a senior practitioner's death, their fellow terreiro members will conduct axexé, a series of rituals which transform the deceased into an ancestral spirit of the terreiro's own pantheon. This ensures that they do not become a potentially dangerous wandering spirit. A wide range of offerings, including sacrificed animals, are given both to the dead individual and to accompanying orixás and other spirits during the axexé. A Roman Catholic mass will also be performed.

History 

Candomblé formed in the early part of the nineteenth century. Although African religions had been present in Brazil since the early 16th century, Johnson noted that Candomblé, as "an organized, structured liturgy and community of practice called Candomblé" only arose later.

Origins

Candomblé originated among enslaved Africans transplanted to Brazil during the Atlantic slave trade. Slavery was widespread in West Africa; most slaves were prisoners of war captured in conflicts with neighbouring groups, although some were convicted criminals or those in debt. African slaves first arrived in Brazil in the 1530s, and were present in Bahia by the 1550s. Over the course of the trade, around four million Africans were transported to Brazil, an area that received more enslaved Africans than any other part of the Americas. Within Brazil itself, these Africans were most concentrated in Bahia.

In the 16th century, most of the enslaved came from the Guinea coast, but by the 17th century Angola and Congo populations had become dominant. Then, between 1775 and 1850, the majority of slaves were Yoruba and Dahomean, coming from the Gulf of Benin, largely in what is now Benin and Nigeria. Priests of the Oyo Empire were likely among the enslaved when the latter was attacked by Fulani and Fon groups. As the last wave of slaves, these Yoruba and Dahomean people became numerically dominant among Afro-Brazilians, resulting in their traditional cosmology becoming ascendant over that of longer established communities. On being brought to Brazil, these slaves were divided into "nations", primarily on their port of embarkation rather than their original etho-cultural identities. This process meant that Africans of different cultural backgrounds, regions, and religions were thrown together under a unifying term such as "Nagô", the latter used for those exported from the Bight of Benin.

Transportation merged deities venerated in different regions in Africa as part of the same pantheon. Whereas in Africa, people had generally venerated deities associated with their specific region, these commitments were broken up by enslavement and transportation. Of the thousands of orishas venerated in West Africa, this was cut down to a much smaller pantheon in Brazil. Which deities continued to be venerated probably depended on their continued relevance in the new Brazilian context. Orisha associated with agriculture were abandoned, probably because slaves had little reason to protect the harvests of slave-owners. 
By the 18th century, accounts of African-derived rituals performed in Brazil were common, at which point they were referred to generically as calundu, a term of Bantu origin. A 17th and 18th century ritual that incorporated drumming and spiritual possession, known as a Calundu, is believed to be an influence of Candomble's drumming works.

The Roman Catholic nature of Brazilian colonial society, which allowed for a cult of saints, may have permitted greater leeway for the survival of traditional African religions than were available in Protestant-dominant areas of the Americas.
Many of the slaves learned to classify their orixás in relation to the Roman Catholic saints and the calendar of saints' days. There is no evidence that the slaves simply used the cult of saints to conceal orixá worship, but rather that devotees understood the two pantheons as comprising similar figures with similar abilities to fix certain problems. Some ecclesiastical figures in the Roman Catholic Church saw the syncretisation as a positive step in the process of converting the Africans to Christianity. The Christian teaching provided to enslaved Africans was often rudimentary. Among slave owners, there was also a belief that allowing the slaves to continue their traditional religions would allow old enmities between different African communities to persevere, thus making it less likely the slaves would unify and turn against the slave-owners. It was also thought that allowing the slaves to take part in their traditional customs would expend energies that might otherwise be directed toward rebellion. However, as steps were taken to convert the African populations to Christianity in Brazil, many Africans had been converted before being brought to the Americas. In Brazil, enslaved Africans and their descendants were also exposed to ceremonial magic practices from Iberia.

19th century

After enslaved Africans successfully led the Haitian Revolution, there were growing fears about similar slave revolts in Brazil. The 1820s and 1830s saw increased police repression of African-derived religions in Brazil. Laws introduced in 1822 allowed police to shut down batuques, or drumming ceremonies among the African population. It was during this period that the Engenho Velho ("Old Sugar Mill") terreiro was established; it was from this group that most Nagô terreiros descended. Various records indicated that Creoles and Whites were also sometimes taking part in the rites which the police were suppressing.

In 1822, Brazil declared itself independent of Portugal. Under British pressure, the Brazilian government passed the Quieróz law of 1850 which abolished the slave trade, although not slavery itself. In 1885 all slaves over the age of 60 were declared free, and in 1888 slavery was abolished entirely. Although now free, life for Brazil's former slaves rarely improved. Various emancipated Yoruba began trading between Brazil and West Africa, and a significant role in the creation of Candomblé were several African freemen who were affluent and sent their children to be educated in Lagos. The first terreiros formed in early 19th-century Bahia.
One of the oldest terreiros was the Ilê Axé Iyá Nassô Oká in Salvador, established by Marcelina da Silva, a freed African woman; this was probably active by the 1830s.

Brazil's first republican constitution was produced in 1891; based on the constitutions of France and the United States, it enshrined freedom of religion. However, Afro-Brazilian religious traditions continued to face legal issues; the Penal Code of 1890 had included prohibitions on Spiritism, magic, talismans, and much herbal medicine, impacting Candomblé. The authorities continued to shut down terreiros, claiming they were a threat to public health. The late 19th century saw the first terreiros open in Rio de Janeiro, a city then seeing a rapid expansion in its population. The period also saw various upper-class white Brazilians seeking out Candomblé.

20th and 21st centuries

Candomblé became increasingly public in the 1930s, partly because Brazilians were increasingly encouraged to perceive themselves as part of a multi-racial, mixed society in the midst of President Getúlio Vargas' Estado Novo project. Vargas approved the presidential Law Decree 1202, which recognized the legitimacy of terreiros and allowed them to practice. The Penal Code of 1940 gave additional protections to some terreiros.

By 1940, Johnson argued, Candomblé in its contemporary form was discernible. The 1930s saw a proliferation of academic studies on Candomblé by scholars like Raimundo Nina Rodrigues, Edison Carneiro, and Ruth Landes, with 20th-century studies focusing largely on the Nagô tradition. The growing literature, both scholarly and popular, helped document Candomblé but also contributed to its greater standardisation. The religion spread to new areas of Brazil during the 20th century. In São Paulo, for instance, there were virtually no Candomblé terreiros until the 1960s, reflecting the very small Afro-Brazilian population there, although this grew rapidly, to the extent that there were around 2500 terreiros in the city in the late 1980s and over 4000 by the end of the 1990s. Some practitioners became increasingly well known; the priestess Mãe Menininha do Gantois was often seen as a symbol of Brazil. She had made efforts to improve the image of her terreiro, establishing an administrative directorate to facilitate public relations in 1926. During the 20th century, various organizations emerged to represent the terreiros, notably the Bahian Federation of the Afro-Brazilian Cults, the National Institute and Supreme Sacerdotal Organ of Afro-Brazilian Culture and Tradition, and the Conference of the Tradition and Culture of the Orixás.

By the late 20th century, Candomblé was increasingly respectable within Brazil. This was partly fuelled by well-educated Afro-Brazilians embracing their previously stigmatised cultural heritage, and by the growing number of intellectual and white initiates. By the early 21st century, tourist literature increasingly portrayed Candomblé as an intrinsic part of Brazilian culture, especially in Salvador. References to the religion's beliefs became more apparent in Brazilian society; Varig Airlines for instance used the tagline "Fly with Axé." When the Internet emerged, various terreiros set up their own websites, while footage of its rituals were distributed through YouTube. 

In the closing decades of the 20th century, some practitioners sought to remove Roman Catholic-influenced aspects from the religion to return it to its West African roots. In 1983, the prominent priestess Mãe Stella Azevedo for instance called on adherents to renounce all Roman Catholic saints and transform Candomblé into a more purely African tradition. Many of those emphasising this Afrocentric perspective were white middle-class practitioners, who re-emphasised Africa as a new source of authority because they had little standing with the predominantly Afro-Brazilian Bahian Candomblé establishment. Many terreiros distinguished themselves from this approach, arguing that to abandon the Roman Catholic elements would be to abandon an important part of their religious ancestry. The 2000s also saw growing opposition from Evangelical Protestants, including a rise in physical attacks on practitioners and terreiros; Candomblé practitioners responded with marches against religious intolerance from 2004 onward, with the first national march taking place in Salvador in 2009. On 1 January 2023, President Luiz Inácio Lula da Silva signed a law establishing 21 March as the National Day of Traditions of African Roots and Candomblé Nations. It was set to coincide with the International Day for the Elimination of Racial Discrimination.

Demographics
In 2010, there were a recorded 167,363 practitioners in Brazil. One census report indicated that around 1.3 percent of Brazil's population identified as Candomblé followers. This likely reflects only the number of initiates, with a larger body of non-initiates sometimes attending ceremonies or consulting initiates for healing and other services.
The religion has also established a presence abroad, initially in other parts of South America like Argentina and Uruguay, and from the 1970s in Portugal. Since then, Candomblé has appeared elsewhere in Europe, including in Spain, France, Belgium, Italy, Germany, Austria, and Switzerland. In Brazil, Candomblé is a largely urban phenomenon. It is generally found among the poor, although there are terreiros whose membership is largely middle-class or upper-class. The religion's membership is more diverse in southern Brazil, where there are large numbers of white and middle-class followers. Most practitioners are poorer, black women; various anthropologists have observed a far higher number of females than males in the terreiros they studied. Women dominate in the Ketu nation, although men instead dominate the Angola and Jeje nations. Despite its Afro-Brazilian origins, Candomblé has attracted those from other ethnic backgrounds; by the 1950s it was being described as a religion of mulattos and whites as well as blacks, while in a country like Germany it has attracted white followers with no Brazilian heritage.

It has also been claimed that Candomblé offers a sense of empowerment to people who are societally marginalised; some practitioners have cited its tolerance of homosexuality as part of its appeal, especially in contrast to evangelical Christianity's typical condemnation of same-sex sexual activity. Male practitioners are often stereotyped as being gay, and it has attracted many male homosexuals as practitioners; in Rio de Janeiro for example the gay male community has had longstanding links with the terreiros, which have often been seen as part of a gay social network. Many gay men who have joined have cited it as offering a more welcoming atmosphere to them than other religious traditions active in Brazil. Various lesbians have also been identified as practitioners, although the anthropologist Andrea Stevenson Allen argued that they rarely received the same level of affirmation from the religion as their gay male counterparts.

Many practitioners of Candomblé already have a family link to the tradition, with their parents or other elder relatives being initiates. Others convert to the movement without having had any family connections; some of those who convert to Candomblé have already explored Pentecostalism, Spiritism, or Umbanda; some Umbandists feel that they can go "deeper" by moving towards Candomblé. Many describe having been ill or plagued with misfortune prior to being initiated into Candomblé, having determined through divination that their ailments would cease if they did so.
Johnson noted that Candomblé appears to appeal to those who identify strongly with an African heritage; some black people in Germany have been attracted to it because they feel it is a more authentically African religion than the forms of Christianity and Islam now dominant across Africa.
Some like that it makes them feel part of a community.

The religion's "core area of practice" lies in the city of Salvador and surrounding area. A 1997 census by the Bahian Federation of Afro-Brazilian Religions recorded 1,144 terreiros active in the city. Within Brazil, Candomblé's influence is most pervasive in Bahia, and practitioners in Rio de Janeiro and Sâo Paulo often regard Bahian terreiros as being more authentic, with deeper fundamentos. It is "most widely practiced" in the Bahian city of Salvador, a settlement that practitioners sometimes regard as a holy city. Several thousand terreiros exist in Salvador, resulting in it being called "Black Rome." In Bahia, it is the Nagô nation that has the largest number of houses and practitioners.

Although lineages are independent, practitioners have formed umbrella organisations, called "federations", in most Brazilian states. These represent practitioners in their dealings with the government and society more broadly. They have also established a national organisation, the Conference of the Tradition and Culture of the Orixás (CONTOC), through which to represent their interests.

Reception and influence

Since the 1960s, Candomblé has featured in various films, such as The Given Word (1962) and The Amulet of Ogum (1974), as well as documentaries like Geraldo Sarno's Iaô (1974). The Brazilian novelist Jorge Amado makes repeated references to Candomblé throughout his work. In the 1980s, the American writer Toni Morrison visited Brazil to learn more about Candomblé. She subsequently combined ideas from Candomblé with those of Gnosticism in her depiction of the religion pursued by "The Convent", an all-female community in her 1991 novel Paradise.
Themes from the religion have also been included in the work of Brazilian filmmaker Glauber Rocha. References to the religion also appeared in Brazilian popular music. For instance, Maria Bethânia and Gal Costa's song "Prayer to Mãe Menininha" made it into the country's chart.

Candomblé has been described as a much maligned religion. Practitioners have often encountered intolerance and religious discrimination; terreiros have sometimes been physically attacked. More extreme hostile views of Candomblé have regarded it as devil worship, while milder critical views see it as superstition that attracts the simple-minded and desperate. Brazil's Roman Catholics have mixed opinions of Candomblé, with some expressing tolerance and others expressing hostility to the presence of Candomblé practitioners at mass. Evangelical and Pentecostal groups present themselves as avowed enemies of Candomblé, regarding it as diabolical and targeting it as part of their "spiritual war" against Satan. Those denigrating Candomblé often refer to it with the term macumba, typically used for harmful sorcery. Leaders of terreiros are often stereotyped as greedy and conniving. Candomblé practitioners sometimes abandon the religion for forms of Christianity; in certain cases, they later return to Candomblé.

Johnson noted that many academics who have studied Candomblé have sought to portray it in the best light possible, so as to counter racist and primitivist stereotypes about Afro-Brazilians. Academic studies have in turn influenced the way that the religion is practices, helping to establish "correct practice" among divergent groups. Many terreiros own copies of academic studies of Candomblé by scholars such as Pierre Verger, Roger Bastide, and Juana Elbein dos Santos. Various practitioners own books on Candomblé and other Afro-American religions, including those written in languages they cannot understand, as a mean of presenting an image of authority.

Although objects associated with Candomblé were initially found only in police museums, thus underscoring the stereotypical association between the religion and criminality, as it gained greater public acceptance such objects eventually came to be featured in museums devoted to folklore and Afro-Brazilian culture. From the 1990s onward, practitioners began establishing their own museum displays within their terreiros. For instance, the bedroom of the famous Candomblé priestess Mãe Menininha do Gantois, located within her Bahia terreiro, was converted into a memorial within in 1992 and then formally recognised as a heritage site in 2002. Candomblé practitioners have also lobbied other museums to change the way that the latter display items associated with the religion. For instance, practitioners successfully called upon the Museum of the City of Salvador to remove some otá stones from public display, arguing that according to the regulations of the religion such items should never be visible to the public.

References

Citations

Sources

Further reading 

 
 
 
 
 Carneiro, Edison.  "The Structure of African Cults in Bahia"  Civilzacao Brasileira, Rio de Janeiro. 1936–37.

 Gordon, Jacob U.  " Yoruba Cosmology And Culture in Brazil: A Study of African Survivals in the New World." Journal of Black Studies, Vol.10, No 2. (December 1979): P. 231- 244
 Herskovits, Melville J.  "The Social Organization of the Afrobrazilian Candomble."  Proceedings of the Congress São Paulo, 1955.
Jensen, Tina Gudrun. 1999. Discourses on Afro-Brazilian Religion: from de-Africanization to re-Africanization. In Latin American Religion in Motion. eds. Christian Smith and Joshua Prokopy, New York: Routledge, 265–283.

 
 
 Matory, J. Lorand.  "Gendered Agendas: The Secrets Scholars Keep about Yoruba-Atlantic Religion."  Gender & History 15, no. 3 (November 2003): p. 409–439."
 Omari-Tunkara, Mikelle S. "Manipulating the Sacred: Yoruba Art, Ritual, and Resistance in Brazilian Candomble". 2005 – Wayne State University Press.
 Parés, Luis Nicolau. 2013. The Formation of Candomblé: Vodun History and Ritual in Brazil. Translated by Richard Vernon. Chapel Hill, NC: University of North Carolina Press. . 
 Reis, João José. "Candomblé in Nineteenth-Century Bahia: Priests, Followers, Clients" in Rethinking the African Diaspora:The Making of a Black Atlantic World in the Bight of Benin and Brazil Mann, Kristina and Bay, Edna G. Ed. Geu Heuman and James Walvin. 2001-Frank Cass
 Reis, João José. Slave Rebellion in Brazil:The Muslim Uprising of 1835 in Bahia (Baltimore and London:The Johns Hopkins University Press,1995).
 
 .
 McGowan, Chris and Pessanha, Ricardo. "The Brazilian Sound: Samba, Bossa Nova and the Popular Music of Brazil." 1998. 2nd edition. Temple University Press.

External links 

 A practitioners english Guide to Candomblé /

Portuguese 
 Afro-Brazil Museum Index
 – February 2: Feast Day at Sea

French 
 Prefaces of Berger's book

 
Religious syncretism